Nicola Beati (born 13 February 1983 in Perugia) is an Italian footballer who plays as a midfielder for Foligno Calcio. He previously played for Crotone.

Football career
He started his career at Internazionale's youth system. He captained the Primavera side to win the 2001–02 league title.
 
He made his Inter first team debut against Bologna at Serie A, on 17 June 2001.

In second half of 2003–04 and 2004–05 season, he was on loan to Triestina and Spezia.

He was transferred to Arezzo in summer 2005, in co-ownership deal for a peppercorn fee of €500.

Beati left on loan to his hometown club Perugia in January 2007, In June Arezzo got the remain 50% registration rights for free.

In August 2009, Beati signed a 3-year contract with Crotone. In January 2011 he swapped club with Caetano.

In 2014 he moved to Foligno Calcio.

References

External links
 FIGC.it 
 Perugia Calcio player's schedule 
 archivio.Inter.it
 Football.it Profile 

Italian footballers
Italy under-21 international footballers
Italy youth international footballers
Inter Milan players
U.S. Triestina Calcio 1918 players
Spezia Calcio players
S.S. Arezzo players
A.C. Perugia Calcio players
F.C. Crotone players
Frosinone Calcio players
A.S.D. Sorrento players
A.S.D. Città di Foligno 1928 players
Serie A players
Serie B players
Association football midfielders
Sportspeople from Perugia
1983 births
Living people
Footballers from Umbria